Oliver Irving is a British film director. He directed and wrote How To Be starring Robert Pattinson. Based in New York, he is currently in post-production on the feature comedy-thriller Ghost Team, which stars Jon Heder, David Krumholtz, Melonie Diaz, Paul W. Downs with Justin Long and Amy Sedaris and is set for release in fall 2016.

References

External links
 “Timely Look”: Interview with Oliver Irving, director of How to Be
 

British film directors
Living people
Alumni of Arts University Bournemouth
Year of birth missing (living people)
Place of birth missing (living people)